Matthew Ian Fozard (born 3 March 1995) is a Wales international rugby league footballer who plays as a  for the Widnes Vikings in the RFL Championship.

He previously played for St Helens in the Super League, and on loan from Saints at the Batley Bulldogs in the Championship and the Rochdale Hornets in Championship 1. Fozard also played for the Sheffield Eagles in the Championship and previously played for the Broncos in the Betfred Super League and the Championship.

Background
Fozard was born in Widnes, Lancashire, England.

Career

St Helens
He played for St Helens in the Super League, and on loan from Saints at the Batley Bulldogs in the Championship and the Rochdale Hornets in Championship 1.

He made his Super League début on 21 April 2014 for St Helens against the Widnes Vikings.

Sheffield Eagles
In October 2015 Fozard joined the Sheffield Eagles on a two-year deal. Fozard played for the Sheffield Eagles in the Championship for three seasons.

London Broncos
In October 2018 Fozard joined the London Broncos on a two-year deal.

Widnes Vikings
On 7 Sep 2021 it was reported that he had signed for Widnes Vikings in the RFL Championship.

International
On 7 October 2014, Fozard was selected by Welsh coach John Kear to play in Wales' 2014 European Cup campaign. Fozard made his international début against the French in Albi.

In October 2016, Fozard played for Wales in the 2017 World Cup qualifierswhere he was man of the match against Italy. He was then also selected as a squad member for the tournament finals. He played in all three of their group games against Papua New Guinea, Fiji and Ireland.

Club statistics

References

External links

London Broncos profile
SL profile
Sheffield Eagles profile
Profile at saints.org.uk
(archived by web.archive.org) Statistics at rlwc2017.com
Wales profile
Welsh profile

1995 births
Living people
Batley Bulldogs players
English rugby league players
London Broncos players
Rochdale Hornets players
Rugby league hookers
Rugby league players from Widnes
Sheffield Eagles players
St Helens R.F.C. players
Wales national rugby league team players
Widnes Vikings players